Scott Manor House was built sometime between 1769 and 1772 and is now a museum in Bedford, Nova Scotia.  It is the second oldest house in the Halifax Regional Municipality, after the Morris House, and was built by Joseph Scott on the land once owned by his brother Captain George Scott. The house was built next to Fort Sackville, which was under the command of Joseph Scott (1760).

See also 
History of the Halifax Regional Municipality
 List of oldest buildings and structures in Halifax, Nova Scotia
 Fultz House

References

Other reading 
 Brian Cuthertson and Gillis Architects. Joseph Scott and the Scott Manor House. Halifax Regional Municipality. 2002 
 Bedford’s buried history. Chronicle Herald. 24 May 2013
  Scott Manor House - Canada's Historic Places
  Scott Manor House - Official Site

Houses in Nova Scotia
Historic house museums in Nova Scotia
Museums in Halifax, Nova Scotia